Timothy Patrick O'Rourke, nicknamed Voiceless Tim, was a Major League Baseball player. He played five seasons in the majors, from  until , for six different teams. He was primarily an infielder, playing two-thirds of his games at either third base or shortstop.

References

External links

Major League Baseball third basemen
Major League Baseball shortstops
Syracuse Stars (AA) players
Columbus Solons players
Baltimore Orioles (NL) players
Louisville Colonels players
St. Louis Browns (NL) players
Washington Senators (1891–1899) players
Minneapolis Millers (baseball) players
Emporia Reds players
Dallas Hams players
Peoria Canaries players
Galveston Sand Crabs players
Houston Mud Cats players
St. Paul Apostles players
Duluth Whalebacks players
Columbus Reds players
Sioux City Cornhuskers players
St. Paul Saints (Western League) players
Kansas City Blues (baseball) players
New Castle Quakers players
Springfield Governors players
Rock Island-Moline Islanders players
Omaha Omahogs players
19th-century baseball players
Baseball players from Chicago
1864 births
1938 deaths
Rock Island Islanders players